Bodkin Hazel Wood is a  biological Site of Special Scientific Interest (SSSI), just south of the village of Hawkesbury Upton in South Gloucestershire, notified in 1974.

Biological interest
The site has a diverse ground flora. In addition to common species such as dog's mercury (Mercurialis perennis), primrose (Primula vulgaris), bluebell (Hyacinthoides non-scripta), wood anemone (Anemone nemorosa), wood sorrel (Oxalis acetosella) and ramsons (Allium ursinum), a number of scarce species are present; these include cow-wheat (Melampyrum pratense), herb Paris (Paris quadrifolia), toothwort (Lathraea squamaria), Autumn crocus (Colchicum autumnale), lily-of-the-valley (Convallaria majalis) and yellow star-of-Bethlehem (Gagea lutea).

References

Sites of Special Scientific Interest in Avon
South Gloucestershire District
Sites of Special Scientific Interest notified in 1974
Forests and woodlands of Gloucestershire